The Battle of Mons Seleucus was fought in 353 between the forces of the Roman emperor Constantius II and the forces of the usurper Magnentius. Constantius' forces were victorious, and Magnentius later committed suicide.

Background
Following his defeat at Mursa, Magnentius fled to Aquileia. This campaign included summoning all those loyal to him to support him in Aquileia. Decentius, brother of Magnentius and newly made Caesar, was engaged with an incursion of Alemanni, and was unable to lend his army to support Magnentius.

Constantius spent his time recruiting troops and retaking towns occupied by Magnentius. In the summer of 352, Constantius moved into Italy, only to find that Magnentius had chosen not to defend the peninsula.

Battle
The armies met at Mons Seleucus, in what is now La Bâtie-Montsaléon in Hautes-Alpes, south-eastern France. Constantius was again victorious and Magnentius killed himself on 10 August 353. Following his conclusive battle, Constantius wintered his troops at Arles.

Aftermath
Constantius, now undisputed Emperor of the Roman Empire, appointed  Julian Caesar over the western half of the Empire in 355/6, and instigated a campaign to persecute those who had supported Magnentius. According to Ammianus Marcellinus, Constantius had become more "cruel, violent, and suspicious with age", and his notarii and bodyguards needed no pretext beyond mere suspicion to inflict punishment.

Notes

References

Sources

353
Mons Seleucus 353
Mons Seleucus 353
350s in the Roman Empire
Mons Seleucus
Hautes-Alpes
Mons Seleucus
Constantius II